Luís Castro (footballer, born 1961), Portuguese football manager
Luís Castro (football manager, born 1980), Portuguese football manager